James Joseph Riley is an American fluid dynamicist. He is PACCAR professor of engineering in the department of mechanical engineering of the University of Washington.

Riley graduated from Rockhurst University in 1965. He received a PhD from Johns Hopkins University in 1972. He is a fellow of the American Physical Society, of the American Society of Mechanical Engineers and of the American Association for the Advancement of Science. He was also elected a member of the National Academy of Engineering in 2014 for contributions in analysis, modeling, and computations of transitioning and turbulent phenomena.

References

Living people
University of Washington faculty
21st-century American engineers
Rockhurst University alumni
Scientists from Kansas City, Missouri
Physicists from Missouri
Scientists from Missouri
Johns Hopkins University alumni
Fellows of the American Physical Society
Fellows of the American Academy of Arts and Sciences
Fellows of the American Society of Mechanical Engineers
Year of birth missing (living people)